Simone Pedroni is an Italian pianist and conductor born in Novara, Italy.

Pedroni graduated from Milan's Giuseppe Verdi Conservatory in 1990. In 1995, he received his master's degree at Accademia Pianistica "Incontri col Maestro" in Imola, Italy, where he studied with Lazar Berman, Franco Scala and Piero Rattalino.

Pedroni was the gold medalist of the Ninth Van Cliburn International Piano Competition in 1993.

References

External links 
Website - English

Living people
Year of birth missing (living people)
Italian classical pianists
Male classical pianists
Italian male pianists
Prize-winners of the Van Cliburn International Piano Competition
21st-century classical pianists
21st-century Italian male musicians